Kevin Deagan (25 December 1923 – 13 June 1999) was  a former Australian rules footballer who played with Richmond in the Victorian Football League (VFL).

Notes

External links 		
		
		

		
		
1923 births		
1999 deaths		
Australian rules footballers from New South Wales		
Richmond Football Club players
Sturt Football Club players
Australian Army personnel of World War II
Australian Army soldiers
Royal Australian Air Force personnel of World War II
Royal Australian Air Force airmen